Counter-Japanese Military and Political University, also commonly known as Kàngdà and Kangri Junzheng University, was a comprehensive public university located in Yan'an, Shaanxi, the headquarters of the Chinese Communist Party during the Second Sino-Japanese War. Its former site has been converted to a memorial hall.

History
Counter-Japanese Military and Political University was founded in 1931 in Ruijin, Jiangxi, capital of Jiangxi Soviet, it was initially called China Red Army School and then extended to a college named China Red Army College in 1933. During the fifth counter-campaign against "encirclement and suppression" in 1934, the college relocated to Wayaobao Town of Anding County in northwest China's Shaanxi province (Shaanbei), formed China Workers' and Peasants' Red Army School by the merger of Shanbei Red Army School and later changed the name to Xibei Counter-Japanese University of the Red Army in 1936. Zhou Kun was its president and Yuan Guoping was political commissar. On January 20, 1937, it was renamed "Counter-Japanese University of the Red Army". Lin Biao was its president, Liu Bocheng was vice-president, and Mao Zedong was its chairman of the Board of Education. In March 1943, Xu Xiangqian succeed Lin Biao as the president. After the establishment of the People's Republic of China, the university was merged into PLA National Defence University.

Culture
 Motto: 
 University Song: Song of the Military University

Presidents

Notable alumni
 Chen Geng
 Feng Yuhe
 Geng Biao
 Guo Shusheng
 He Changgong
 He Jinnian
 Hu Yaobang
 Hu Zhuting
 Lai Chuanzhu
 Li Tao
 Li Xiannian
 Liu Huinong
 Liu Xiping
 Liu Yalou
 Luo Binghui
 Luo Huasheng
 Luo Ronghuan
 Mo Wenhua
 Peng Xuefeng
 Qi Xin
 Shao Shiping
 Su Zhenhua
 Tan Guansan
 Tan Zheng
 Wang Weizhou
 Wang Jian'an
 Wang Ping
 Xi Henghan
 Xiao Wenjiu
 Xu Shiyou
 Yang Chengwu
 Yang Dezhi
 Yang Lisan
 Yao Jiming
 Zeng Xisheng
 Zhang Aiping
 Zhang Chunqing
 Zhang Jingwu
 Zhao Erlu
 Zhou Chunquan
 Zhou Jianping
 Zhou Wenlong
 Zhou Zikun

Notable faculty
 Ai Siqi
 Du Pingzhai
 Feng Dafei
 Feng Zhiguo
 Guo Huaruo
 Han Zhenji
 Li Dongchao
 Liao Guanxian
 Liu Shaoqing
 Luo Shiwen
 Ren Baige
 Xu Maoyong
 Yang Lanshi
 Zhang Qingfu
 Zhang Ruxin
 Zhang Wenhua
 Zhao Shouyi

References

Further reading
 Li, Xiaobing. China at War: An Encyclopedia (ABC-CLIO, 2012) pp 5–8.
 Saich, Tony, and Benjamin Yang. eds. The Rise to Power of the Chinese Communist Party: Documents and Analysis: Documents and Analysis (`996)

 
Universities and colleges in Shaanxi
Educational institutions established in 1931
Yan'an
1931 establishments in China